Salvador Jiménez (born 26 December 1973) is a Honduran swimmer. He competed in three events at the 1992 Summer Olympics.

References

1973 births
Living people
Honduran male swimmers
Olympic swimmers of Honduras
Swimmers at the 1992 Summer Olympics
Place of birth missing (living people)
20th-century Honduran people